Peter Andrew Willis (born 16 February 1960) is an English musician, songwriter and guitarist, best known as a founding member of the band Def Leppard. He co-wrote many tracks and played guitar on the band's first three albums: On Through the Night, High 'n' Dry, and Pyromania, which was being recorded at the time of his departure. He was fired from Def Leppard in 1982 and replaced by Phil Collen. In 2019, Willis was inducted into the Rock and Roll Hall of Fame as a member of Def Leppard.

Career
Willis attended Tapton School and has been a guitar enthusiast since his youth. He was a fan of Jimi Hendrix.

In his early adult life, he formed a band called Atomic Mass with Nicholas Mackley, Rick Savage, Paul Hampshire, and Tony Kenning. He met Joe Elliott in 1977 and invited him to audition for the band, which later became Def Leppard. Willis was one of the main songwriters of the band during their first three albums.

He was dismissed from the band on 11 July 1982, during the recording of Pyromania, due to excessive drinking that hampered his guitar playing, and was replaced by guitarist Phil Collen two days later. Willis later recorded with the bands Gogmagog (with former and current members of Iron Maiden) and Roadhouse.

Willis played Hamer Standard guitars almost exclusively during his tenure with Def Leppard. 

In 2003, Willis left the music business. He now runs his own property management company in Sheffield.

Personal life 
Willis married Lindsay Smith in 1985, and had two sons, Luke and Andrew. The family resides in Crookes, Sheffield.

Discography

With Def Leppard
 The Def Leppard E.P. (1979) (aka Getcha Rocks Off EP)
 On Through the Night (1980)
 High 'n' Dry (1981)
 Pyromania (1983)

With Gogmagog
 I Will Be There EP (1985)

With Roadhouse
 Roadhouse (1991)

References

External Links
 
 

1960 births
Living people
People educated at Tapton School
Def Leppard members
English rock guitarists
English heavy metal guitarists
Lead guitarists
Musicians from Sheffield
Musicians from London
Gogmagog (band) members
20th-century English musicians